Purakau Maika ( – 4 August 1917) was a New Zealand newspaper editor and publisher. Of Māori descent, he identified with the Ngāti Kahungunu and Rangitāne iwi. He was born in New Zealand in about 1852, and died at Hurunuiorangi Pā, Gladstone, on 4 August 1917.

References

1850s births
1917 deaths
New Zealand writers
Ngāti Kahungunu people
Rangitāne people
New Zealand Māori writers
New Zealand publishers (people)
New Zealand Māori activists
Year of birth missing